Gold Vol. 1 is a French-language compilation album by Canadian singer Celine Dion, released in France by Versailles on 2 October 1995. It has fourteen rare songs recorded between 1982 and 1988, including the Eurovision-winning "Ne partez pas sans moi". Later, the album was also released in other countries around the world, under many different titles, with many different covers, and by various music labels. Gold Vol. 1 was certified 2× Gold in France, where it peaked at number thirty on the chart. It also charted in Belgium Wallonia, Japan and the United Kingdom.

Background and content
After the success of D'eux, which became the best-selling French-language album of all time, various music labels around the world released compilations with Dion's early and rare recordings from the 1980s. They were issued by various music labels, with different covers and under many various titles: Gold Vol. 1, For You, Les premières années, Ne partez pas sans moi, La Romance, Les premières chansons vol. 1, The Best of Early Years or Classique - A Love Collection. Gold Vol. 1 was released on 2 October 1995 in France, and other titles were issued later in Europe, Asia, Australia and South America.

Critical reception and commercial performance
Rob Theakston of AllMusic gave the album three out of five stars and said that the performances offer a glimpse into the developing style Dion would later make her own. James Christopher Monger also of AllMusic gave the album two and a half out stars and wrote that the album has fourteen tracks in Dion's native French tongue from her pre-Titanic years, all of which were very popular in Canada and France.

Gold Vol. 1 reached number thirty in France in October 1995 and was eventually certified 2× Gold in 2000, after selling 385,400 copies. The album also peaked at number fourteen in Portugal, number thirty-two in Belgium Wallonia in November 1995 and sixty-four in Japan in March 1996. In the United Kingdom, it was released be two music labels: D Sharp Music (titled For You) and Epic Records (titled Les premières années). For You peaked at number 138 on the UK Albums Chart in February 1996. Les premières années entered the UK chart in October 1996 and peaked at number 135 in September 1998.

Track listing

Charts

Certifications and sales

Release history

References

External links
 
 

1995 compilation albums
Albums produced by Eddy Marnay
Celine Dion compilation albums